The Musquodoboit Trailway is a  multiuse rail trail located in Halifax County, Nova Scotia, running the distance from Gibralter to Musquodoboit Harbour. The entire route is part of the Halifax spur of The Great Trail, and follows Nova Scotia Route 357 for its length.

History
The railbed that the trail uses was originally built by the Intercolonial Railway just prior to World War I and absorbed into Canadian National when the Government of Canada created it. The rails originally ran from Dartmouth to Upper Musquodoboit, hauling timber, gravel, and agricultural goods, as well as passengers. An extension to Guysborough was planned, but never materialized.

Route
The trailway begins at the Musquodoboit Harbour Railway Museum, but it mostly considered starting at Park Road, a few hundred meters north of Nova Scotia Trunk 7 in Musquodoboit Harbour, and almost immediately crosses the Trestle Bridge, a  steel truss bridge over the Musquodoboit River, offering a view of its extensive and largely undeveloped flood plains.

For about a kilometer, the trailway is squeezed between steep granite cliffs of the Eastern Shore Granite Ridge on the eastern side and Bayer Lake to the left.

Beyond the picnic table lie the Turtle Cove bridge, a wooden trestle bridge, and another trailhead for the Admiral Lake Loop, as well as the South Granite Ridge Trail. From this point onwards the trail passes mainly through the rich lower Musquodoboit Valley, sometimes approaching the granite cliffs to the east, sometimes with glimpses of the river to the west. At around the halfway point is Norma's Place, a picnic shelter, and a connection to the North and South Granite Ridge Trails.

Here it enters thicker forest, and the last  run right next to Highway 357 and a steep granite embankment.

Spur rails
Aside from the main trail, the Musquodoboit Trailways association maintains several trails that go up into the Eastern Shore Granite Ridge to the east of the main trail. These trails are for hiking only narrow, rugged, and have steep grades.

Skull Rock
This is a lookout off of a side trail known as Admiral Lake Loop Trail. The lookout is set on a mountain that resembles a skull. The lookout has a picnic spot. A women fell off of the rock in the late 2010s.

References

Hiking trails in Nova Scotia